Mechelen was a constituency used to elect members of the Belgian Chamber of Representatives between 1831 and 1995, when it was merged into the constituency of Mechelen-Turnhout.

Representatives

References

Defunct constituencies of the Chamber of Representatives (Belgium)